is a Japanese volleyball player.

Life
She was born with the name Ya Chen Wang in China. Whilst being educated in America she played for Jefferson College and Long Beach State. She graduated from Jefferson College in 2009.

She became a naturalized Japanese citizen in 2015 and assumed a Japanese name. She was selected for the Japan women's national volleyball team in 2017.

References

1988 births
Chinese emigrants to Japan
Japanese women's volleyball players
Living people
Naturalized citizens of Japan
Jefferson College (Missouri) alumni
Long Beach State Beach women's volleyball players
Ageo Medics players

Volleyball players from Beijing